Mark Harris is an American politician serving as a member of the Idaho Senate from the 32nd district. He assumed office on July 22, 2015.

Early life and education
Harris earned a Bachelor of Arts degree in political science from Utah State University.

Career
When John Tippets resigned his seat for an appointment as director of the Idaho Department of Environmental Quality, the Legislative District 32 Republican Central Committee met to fill the vacancy in the Senate seat, sending three names in order of preference to Governor Butch Otter: Harris, Larry Oja of Malad City, and R. Scott Workman of Preston. Governor Otter appointed Harris to serve the remainder of Tippet's term.

Committee assignments
Heath and Welfare Committee
Transportation Committee
Harris previously served on the Agriculture Affairs Committee in 2016.

Elections

References

Living people
Republican Party Idaho state senators
Utah State University alumni
21st-century American politicians
People from Soda Springs, Idaho
Year of birth missing (living people)